Lotte Rausch (24 May 1913 – 11 March 1995) was a German stage and film actress.

Selected filmography
 If We All Were Angels (1936)
 The Broken Jug (1937)
 Triad (1938)
 Women for Golden Hill (1938)
 Bachelor's Paradise (1939)
 My Aunt, Your Aunt (1939)
 Wibbel the Tailor (1939)
 Police Report (1939)
 Twilight (1940)
 Alarm (1941)
 Rembrandt (1942)
 Love Letters (1944)
 The Lost One (1951)
 A Thousand Red Roses Bloom (1952)
 Three Days of Fear (1952)
 Rose of the Mountain (1952)
 The Bachelor Trap (1953)
 The Spanish Fly (1955)
 Father's Day (1955)
 Where the Ancient Forests Rustle (1956)
 The Legs of Dolores (1957)
 Widower with Five Daughters (1957)
 The Muzzle (1958)
 I Learned That in Paris (1960)

References

Bibliography 
 Youngkin, Stephen.  The Lost One: A Life of Peter Lorre. University Press of Kentucky, 2005.

External links 
 

1913 births
1995 deaths
German stage actresses
German film actresses
Actors from Cologne
20th-century German actresses